Colonel Charles MacCarthy (died 20 May 1704) was an Irish Jacobite politician. 

MacCarthy was the son of Dermod MacCarthy of Ballea. In 1678 he served in the regiment of Colonel Thomas Dongan in the service of Louis XIV of France. He later became a colonel of militia in the Irish Army of James II of England. In 1689, he was elected as a Member of Parliament for Bandonbridge in the short-lived Patriot Parliament called by James II. The Corporation of Bandon elected him as provost of the town in 1691, but he was prevented from assuming his position by the Jacobite defeat in the Williamite War in Ireland. Upon his death in 1704, he was buried in Kilcrea Friary.

References

Year of birth unknown
1704 deaths
17th-century Irish people
Irish Jacobites
Irish MPs 1689
Irish soldiers in the army of James II of England
Irish soldiers in the French Army
Charles
Members of the Parliament of Ireland (pre-1801) for County Cork constituencies